Roderick Williams (2 December 1909 – August 1987) was a Welsh professional footballer who played in the Football League for Norwich City, Exeter City, Reading, West Ham United and Clapton Orient as a centre forward.

Personal life 
Williams was born in Newport, Wales and grew up in Wandsworth, England.

Career statistics

References 

English Football League players
Welsh footballers
Association football forwards
Footballers from Newport, Wales
1909 births
1987 deaths
Sutton United F.C. players
Epsom & Ewell F.C. players
Crystal Palace F.C. players
Norwich City F.C. players
Exeter City F.C. players
Reading F.C. players
West Ham United F.C. players
Leyton Orient F.C. players